Kristin Husøy (born 2 April 2001) is a Norwegian singer. She was the runner-up of Melodi Grand Prix 2020, the Norwegian preselection for the Eurovision Song Contest 2020.

Career

2019: The Voice Norway 
In 2019, Husøy was a contestant in the fifth season of The Voice – Norges beste stemme, broadcast by TV 2. She joined Team Yosef after her blind audition, and was eliminated in the first live show.

2020: Melodi Grand Prix 
In 2020, Husøy was selected by the Norwegian broadcaster NRK to participate in Melodi Grand Prix, the national preselection for the Eurovision Song Contest. She competed in the third heat (Central Norway) on 25 January 2020 with the song "Pray For Me", and qualified for the final which took place on 29 February 2020 in her hometown Trondheim. The song was written by the Dutch Songwriters Galeyn Tenhaeff, Marcia Sondeijker, Roel Rats and Neil Hollyn, and was recorded in the Netherlands. In the final, she advanced to the gold final and subsequently the gold duel, but ultimately lost to Ulrikke Brandstorp, winning second place in the competition.

Discography

Singles

References 

Living people
2001 births
Musicians from Trondheim
21st-century Norwegian singers
Norwegian pop singers
The Voice (franchise) contestants
Melodi Grand Prix contestants
21st-century Norwegian women singers